The Changhe Freedom (福瑞达) is a five- to eight-seater Microvan and a two- to five- seater pickup truck made by Changhe. Originally launched as a cheap microvan for third to fourth tier cities, the microvan later spawned more premium passenger models and later developed into a compact MPV product series spawning a variety of vehicles including the Changhe Freedom M50, Changhe Freedom M60 and Changhe Freedom M70.

Overview
The Changhe Freedom was originally launched as a cargo-focused microvan. The purpose could be seen from the design, with the tail lamps located on the rear bumper and providing a maximum tailgate dimension for cargo loading and unloading. Later models were redesigned to fit the tail lamps on the D-pillars which is a design closer to passenger vehicles and MPVs.

The engine option for the Changhe Freedom includes a 1.0 liter inline-four engine producing 60hp and a 1.0 liter inline-four engine producing 95hp, both mated to a 5 speed manual transmission.

Prices of the Changhe Freedom ranges from 28,800 to 47,800 yuan before the model was discontinued.

Changhe Freedom K21 and K22

The Changhe Freedom K21 and K22 are the pickup truck variants of the Changhe Freedom microvan, with the K21 being the single cab and the K22 being the crew cab model.

The post facelift Changhe Freedom K21 was priced from 37,400 to 48,800 yuan, while the post facelift Changhe Freedom K22 was priced from 39,400 to 51,300 yuan.

References

Microvans
Cars introduced in 2007
Changhe vehicles
Cars of China
2010s cars